Summit Airport  is a state-owned public-use airport located in Summit, in the Matanuska-Susitna Borough of the U.S. state of Alaska. It is about six miles south-southwest of Cantwell, Alaska.

Facilities and aircraft 
Summit Airport has one runway designated 3/21 with a gravel surface measuring 3,840 by 80 feet (1,170 x 24 m). For the 12-month period ending December 31, 2005, the airport had 800 aircraft operations, an average of 66 per month: 94% general aviation and 6% scheduled commercial.

References

External links 
 NTSB report of incident at Summit Airport, 22 April 2001
 FAA Alaska airport diagram (GIF)

Airports in Matanuska-Susitna Borough, Alaska